MKO Abiola Stadium is a multi-use stadium in Abeokuta, Nigeria. It is currently used mostly for football matches and is the home stadium of Gateway F.C. The stadium has a capacity of 10,000 people.

Name
The stadium name refers to Moshood Kashimawo Olawale Abiola an important businessman, publisher, politician and aristocrat of Abeokuta, Ogun State.

References

External links
https://web.archive.org/web/20100803050859/http://www.gatewayfc.com/homeground.php

Football venues in Nigeria
Buildings and structures in Abeokuta
Tourist attractions in Abeokuta